The Davis Block, located in north Portland, Oregon, is listed on the National Register of Historic Places.

See also
 National Register of Historic Places listings in North Portland, Oregon

References

External links
 

1890 establishments in Oregon
Commercial buildings completed in 1890
National Register of Historic Places in Portland, Oregon
Romanesque Revival architecture in Oregon
North Portland, Oregon
Eliot, Portland, Oregon
Portland Historic Landmarks